Gilbert Alexander Pontes Burns (born 20 July 1986) is a Brazilian professional mixed martial artist and submission grappler. He currently competes in the Welterweight division for the Ultimate Fighting Championship (UFC). As a grappler, Burns is a three-time World Champion and World Cup gold medalist. He is the older brother of fellow UFC fighter Herbert Burns. He is #5 in the UFC welterweight rankings.

Background
When Burns was young, his father offered to fix his customer's car in trade for three months of jiu-jitsu lessons for all of his boys. Burns started training at the Academia Associação Oriente, an affiliate of Nova União led by Welton Ribeiro.

Grappling career
He trained with Nova Uniao until the 2007 World Championship, where he came in second place.

In 2009, Burns became recognized when he won the silver medal at the World Jiu-Jitsu Championship.

In 2010, Burns attained a high level of international success competing worldwide.  He reached the semifinals of the European Open in January; he defeated heavy favorite Celso Venicius at the World Pro Cup trials; he won the World Cup finals in Abu Dhabi against Claudio Mattos, and he won the Brazilian Nationals in May.

In 2011, Burns achieved his highest recognition as he won the gold medal in the 2011 World Brazilian Jiu-Jitsu Championships.

In 2015, Burns won bronze at Abu Dhabi Submission Wrestling championships (ADCC).

In November 2020, Burns challenged Nate Diaz to a grappling match on an upcoming Submission Underground event, but the match didn't come to fruition.

Burns faced Rafael Lovato Jr. in the main event of Who's Number One on April 30, 2021 and won a unanimous decision.

He then fought against Lucas Barbosa in the main event of BJJ Stars 7 on November 6, 2021. Burns lost by submission after being caught in a rear-naked choke.

Mixed martial arts career

Early career
After winning the 2011 World Brazilian Jiu-Jitsu Championships, Burns decided to make mixed martial arts his main focus and made his professional debut in January 2012.

The Ultimate Fighter: Brazil
In 2012, Burns was chosen by UFC fighter Vitor Belfort to be the head grappling coach for Team Vitor on the first season of The Ultimate Fighter: Brazil.

Ultimate Fighting Championship

2014
Burns made his debut on 26 July 2014 at UFC on Fox 12, replacing an injured Viscardi Andrade against promotional newcomer Andreas Stahl. He won the fight by unanimous decision.

Return to Lightweight
Burns faced promotional newcomer Christos Giagos in a lightweight bout on 25 October 2014 at UFC 179. He won the bout via submission in the first round.  The win also earned him his first Performance of the Night bonus award.

2015
Burns was expected to face Josh Thomson on 21 March 2015 at UFC Fight Night 62.  However, on 26 February, Thomson pulled out of the fight with an undisclosed injury, and was replaced by Alex Oliveira.  After arguably dropping the first two rounds, Burns rallied to win the fight via submission in the third round. This win also earned him his second straight Performance of the Night bonus.

Burns was expected to face Norman Parke on 30 May 2015 at UFC Fight Night 67.  However, Burns pulled out of the fight due to injury in late April and was replaced by Francisco Trinaldo.

Burns faced Rashid Magomedov at UFC Fight Night 77 on 7 November 2015. After getting knocked down multiple times during the bout, he lost the first fight via unanimous decision, marking his first loss in his MMA career.

2016
Burns next faced Łukasz Sajewski on 7 July 2016 at UFC Fight Night 90. He won the fight via submission in the closing seconds of the first round.

Burns faced Michel Prazeres on 24 September 2016 at UFC Fight Night 95. He lost the fight via unanimous decision.

2017
Burns was scheduled to meet Paul Felder on 11 February 2017 at UFC 208. However, Burns pulled out of the fight in mid-January citing injury.

Burns faced Jason Saggo on 16 September 2017 at UFC Fight Night 116. He won the fight via knockout in the second round.

In the beginning of November 2017, Burns stated he had signed a new, four-fight contract with UFC.

2018
Burns was scheduled to face Olivier Aubin-Mercier on 24 February 2018 at UFC on Fox 28. However, on 21 February 2018, both Burns and Aubin-Mercier were pulled from the card, as promotional medical team deemed Burns would be unsafe to meet lightweight upper limit of 156 Ibs limit upon his arrival at the fight week.

Burns was linked to a fight with Lando Vannata on 14 April 2018 at UFC on Fox 29. However, the pairing never materialized as Vannata was unable to accept the fight for this date/event as he was still rehabilitating a recent arm injury, instead Burns was scheduled to face newcomer Dan Moret in this event. He won the fight via knockout one minute into the second round.

Burns faced Dan Hooker on 7 July 2018 at UFC 226. He lost the fight via knockout in the first round, being finished for the first time in his MMA career.

The bout with Olivier Aubin-Mercier was rescheduled and eventually took place on 8 December 2018 at UFC 231. Burns won the fight by unanimous decision.

2019
Burns was expected to face returning veteran Eric Wisely on 27 April 2019 at UFC Fight Night: Jacaré vs. Hermansson. However, it was reported on 18 April that Wisely pulled out of the bout, citing injury. He was replaced by newcomer Mike Davis. Burns won the fight via rear-naked choke submission in the second round.

Burns returned to the welterweight facing Alexey Kunchenko on 10 August 2019 at UFC Fight Night 156, replacing injured Laureano Staropoli. He won the fight via unanimous decision, marking Kunchenko’s first loss in his career.

Burns stepped in as a late replacement to face Gunnar Nelson, on 28 September 2019 at UFC Fight Night 160. He won the fight via unanimous decision.

2020
As the first fight of his new, four-fight contract, Burns faced Demian Maia on 14 March 2020 at UFC Fight Night 170. He won the fight via technical knockout in round one. This win earned him the Performance of the Night award.

Burns faced Tyron Woodley on 30 May 2020 in the main event of UFC on ESPN: Woodley vs. Burns. After knocking Woodley down in the first round and mostly dominating the former champion throughout the fight, Burns won the fight via unanimous decision. This win also earned him his fourth Performance of the Night award.

2021
As the first bout of his new five-fight contract, Burns was scheduled to face Kamaru Usman for the UFC Welterweight Championship on 11 July at UFC 251. However, on 3 July 2020, it was revealed that Burns tested positive for COVID-19, and he was subsequently removed from the card, and replaced by Jorge Masvidal. The title bout with Usman was rescheduled for 12 December, at UFC 256. However, on 5 October 2020, It was reported Usman pulled from his bout, citing more time needed to recover from undisclosed injuries and the bout was postponed to an unknown future date. The bout with Usman took place on 13 February 2021 at UFC 258. Burns knocked Usman down early in the fight, but went on to lose the bout via technical knockout in the third round.

Burns faced Stephen Thompson on 10 July 2021, at UFC 264. He won the fight via unanimous decision.

2022
Burns faced Khamzat Chimaev at UFC 273 on April 9, 2022. He lost the bout via unanimous decision. The fight was awarded the Fight of the Night award. Dana White later announced that Burns would get his win bonus for the fight, despite the loss.

2023
Burns faced Neil Magny on January 21, 2023, at UFC 283. He won the fight via an arm-triangle choke submission in the first round.

Burns is scheduled to face Jorge Masvidal on April 8, 2023, at UFC 287.

Brazilian jiu-jitsu lineage
Mitsuyo "Count Koma" Maeda → Carlos Gracie, Sr. → Carlson Gracie → André Pederneiras  → Rafael Barros → Gilbert Burns

Championships and accomplishments

Mixed martial arts
Ultimate Fighting Championship
Performance of the Night (Four times) vs. Christos Giagos, Alex Oliveira, Demian Maia and Tyron Woodley
Fight of the Night (One time) 
MMAjunkie.com
2021 February Fight of the Month vs. Kamaru Usman
2022 April Fight of the Month vs. Khamzat Chimaev

Grappling credentials
2015
 ADCC World Third place
2013
 IBJJF No-gi World Champion
2011
 IBJJF Gi World Champion
2010
 IBJJF No-gi World Champion
 ADWPJJC World Cup Champion
 UAEJJF Abu Dhabi Pro Champion
 CBJJ Brazilian National Champion
2009
 IBJJF Gi World Runner-up
 CBJJE Brazilian Cup Champion
 IBJJF Third Place European Open
2007
 IBJJF World Runner-up

Mixed martial arts record

|-
|Win
|align=center|21–5
|Neil Magny
|Submission (arm-triangle choke)
|UFC 283
|
|align=center|1
|align=center|4:15
|Rio de Janeiro, Brazil
|
|-
|Loss
|align=center|20–5
|Khamzat Chimaev
|Decision (unanimous)
|UFC 273
|
|align=center|3
|align=center|5:00
|Jacksonville, Florida, United States
|
|-
|Win
|align=center|20–4
|Stephen Thompson
|Decision (unanimous)
|UFC 264
|
|align=center|3
|align=center|5:00
|Las Vegas, Nevada, United States
|
|-
|Loss
|align=center|19–4
|Kamaru Usman
|TKO (punches)
|UFC 258 
|
|align=center|3
|align=center|0:34
|Las Vegas, Nevada, United States
|  
|-
|Win
|align=center|19–3
|Tyron Woodley
|Decision (unanimous)
|UFC on ESPN: Woodley vs. Burns
|
|align=center|5
|align=center|5:00
|Las Vegas, Nevada, United States
|
|-
|Win
|align=center|18–3
|Demian Maia
|TKO (punches)
|UFC Fight Night: Lee vs. Oliveira 
|
|align=center|1
|align=center|2:34
|Brasília, Brazil
|
|-
|Win
|align=center|17–3
|Gunnar Nelson
|Decision (unanimous)
|UFC Fight Night: Hermansson vs. Cannonier 
|
|align=center|3
|align=center|5:00
|Copenhagen, Denmark
|
|-
|Win
|align=center|16–3
|Alexey Kunchenko
|Decision (unanimous)
|UFC Fight Night: Shevchenko vs. Carmouche 2 
|
|align=center|3
|align=center|5:00
|Montevideo, Uruguay
|
|-
|Win
|align=center|15–3
|Mike Davis
|Submission (rear-naked choke)
|UFC Fight Night: Jacaré vs. Hermansson 
|
|align=center|2
|align=center|4:15
|Sunrise, Florida, United States
|
|-
|Win
|align=center|14–3
|Olivier Aubin-Mercier
|Decision (unanimous)
|UFC 231
|
|align=center|3
|align=center|5:00
|Toronto, Ontario, Canada
|
|-
|Loss
|align=center|13–3
|Dan Hooker
|KO (punches)
|UFC 226 
|
|align=center|1
|align=center|2:28
|Las Vegas, Nevada, United States
|
|-
|Win
|align=center|13–2
|Dan Moret
|KO (punches)
|UFC on Fox: Poirier vs. Gaethje 
|
|align=center|2
|align=center|0:59
|Glendale, Arizona, United States
|
|-
|Win
|align=center|12–2
|Jason Saggo
|KO (punch)
|UFC Fight Night: Rockhold vs. Branch 
|
|align=center|2
|align=center|4:55
|Pittsburgh, Pennsylvania, United States
|
|-
|Loss
|align=center|11–2 
|Michel Prazeres
| Decision (unanimous)
|UFC Fight Night: Cyborg vs. Länsberg
|
|align=center| 3
|align=center| 5:00
|Brasília, Brazil
|
|-
|Win
|align=center|11–1
|Łukasz Sajewski
| Submission (armbar)
|UFC Fight Night: dos Anjos vs. Alvarez
|
|align=center|1
|align=center|4:57
|Las Vegas, Nevada, United States
|  
|-
|Loss
|align=center|10–1
|Rashid Magomedov
|Decision (unanimous)
|UFC Fight Night: Belfort vs. Henderson 3
|
|align=center|3
|align=center|5:00
|São Paulo, Brazil
| 
|-
|Win
|align=center|10–0
|Alex Oliveira
|Submission (armbar)
|UFC Fight Night: Maia vs. LaFlare
|
|align=center|3
|align=center|4:14
|Rio de Janeiro, Brazil
|
|-
|Win
|align=center| 9–0
|Christos Giagos
|Submission (armbar)
|UFC 179
|
|align=center|1
|align=center|4:57
|Rio de Janeiro, Brazil
|
|-
|Win
|align=center| 8–0
| Andreas Ståhl
|Decision (unanimous)
| UFC on Fox: Lawler vs. Brown
| 
| align=center|3
| align=center|5:00
| San Jose, California, United States
|
|-
|Win
|align=center| 7–0
|Paulo Teixeira
|TKO (punches)
|Face to Face 7
|
|align=center| 1
|align=center| 1:02
|Rio de Janeiro, Brazil
|
|-
|Win
|align=center| 6–0
|Paulo Gonçalves
|KO (punch)
|Coliseu Extreme Fight 8
|
|align=center| 1
|align=center| 4:57
|Maceió, Brazil
|
|-
|Win
|align=center| 5–0
|Rodolfo Coronel
|Submission (armbar)
|Mixed Submission and Strike Arts 3
|
|align=center| 1
|align=center| 3:41
|Rio de Janeiro, Brazil
|
|-
|Win
|align=center| 4–0
|Paulo Roberto
|TKO (punches)
|CPMMAF: Champion Fights
|
|align=center| 1
|align=center| 1:30
|Salvador, Brazil
|
|-
|Win
|align=center| 3–0
|Vinicius Alves
|Technical Submission (rear-naked choke)
|Watchout Combat Show 20
|
|align=center| 1
|align=center| 1:59
|Rio de Janeiro, Brazil
|
|-
|Win
|align=center| 2–0
|Herels dos Santos
|Submission (armbar)
|Ichigeki Fight Show
|
|align=center| 1
|align=center| 3:30
|São Paulo, Brazil
|
|-
|Win
|align=center| 1–0
|José Salgado
|Submission (rear-naked choke)
|Crown Fighting Championships 5
|
|align=center| 1
|align=center| 2:40
|St. George, Utah, United States
|
|-

Submission grappling record
{| class="wikitable" style="font-size:80%; text-align:left;"
|-
!  Result
!  Rec
!  Opponent
!  Method
!  Event
!  Date
|-
| Loss || 9–5 ||  Lucas Barbosa || Submission (anaconda choke) || BJJ Stars 7 || 6 November 2021
|-
| Win || 9–4 ||  Rafael Lovato Jr. || Decision || Who's #1: Lovato Jr. vs. Burns || 30 April 2021
|-
| Loss || 8–4 ||  Craig Jones || Submission (Heel Hook) || Submission Underground 10 || 22 December 2019
|-
| Win || 8–3 ||  Jake Shields || Decision || Quintet Ultra || 12 December 2019
|-
| Win || 7–3 ||  Kazushi Sakuraba || Decision || Quintet Ultra || 12 December 2019
|-
| Win || 6–3 ||  Yves Edwards || Submission (Rear Naked Choke) || Quintet Ultra || 12 December 2019
|-
| Loss || 5–3 ||   Tommy Langaker|| Decision || Polaris 12 || 30 November 2019
|-
| Win || 5–2 ||  Marcelo Azevedo || Submission (choke) || Third Coast Grappling 2 || 21 June 2019
|-
| Win || 4–2 ||  Gleison Tibau || Submission (Rear Naked Choke) || Titan FC 53 || 15 March 2019
|-
| Win || 3–2 ||  Gregor Gracie || Injury || Polaris 7 || July 14, 2018
|-
| Loss || 2–2 ||  Jake Shields || Quickest Escape || Submission Underground 6 || 3 December 2017
|-
| Win || 2–1 ||  John Combs || Decision || Submission Underground 4 || 14 May 2017
|-
| Win || 1–1 ||  Kron Gracie || Points (2-9) || 2011 IBJJF World Jiu-Jitsu Championship || 5 June 2011
|-
| Loss || 0–1 ||  Michael Langhi || Decision || 2009 IBJJF World Jiu-Jitsu Championship || 29 March 2009
|-

See also
 List of current UFC fighters
 List of male mixed martial artists

References

External links
 

Living people
1986 births
Brazilian expatriate sportspeople in the United States
Brazilian male mixed martial artists
Brazilian practitioners of Brazilian jiu-jitsu
People awarded a black belt in Brazilian jiu-jitsu
Sportspeople from Niterói
Ultimate Fighting Championship male fighters
Welterweight mixed martial artists
Mixed martial artists utilizing Brazilian jiu-jitsu
World No-Gi Brazilian Jiu-Jitsu Championship medalists
Mixed martial artists utilizing catch wrestling
Brazilian jiu-jitsu practitioners who have competed in MMA (men)